Love Is a Promise Whispering Goodbye is the second EP of Canadian alternative rock-emo band Your Favorite Enemies, which was released on June 17, 2008. The album was produced from Canadian label Hopeful Tragedy Records, which the band founded in April 2008 for releasing their debut album, And If I Was To Die In The Morning… Would I Still Be Sleeping With You. It includes seven songs, two new songs, a radio edit and an acoustic version of "Open Your Eyes", three other acoustic songs and three music videos. The album was produced by Your Favorite Enemies and mixed by the band. Only a few weeks following its release, the album was successfully acclaimed on their Japan-Indonesia-World-Tour in 2008.

Track listing

Videos 
 Open Your Eyes (Official video)
 I Might Be Wrong (Live from Paris 2007)
 We Are Your Favorite Enemies (Thousand Lights For Million Souls)

Personnel 
 Alex Foster - Vocals
 Miss Isabell - Keyboard/Backing vocals
 Jeff Beaulieu - Guitar
 Sef Lemelin - Guitar
 Ben Lemelin - Bass guitar
 Charles "Moose" Alicy - Drums

References 

2008 EPs
Your Favorite Enemies albums